PC Quest may refer to:

 pc Quest (band), a pop music group in the 1990s from Oklahoma
 pc Quest (album), the 1991 self-titled first album by pc Quest
 PCQuest (magazine), a technology publication based in New Delhi, India